Microglossa is a genus of Asian and African flowering plants in the tribe Astereae within the family Asteraceae.

 Species
 Microglossa afzelii O.Hoffm. - central Africa
 Microglossa caffrorum (Less.) Grau - South Africa
 Microglossa caudata O.Hoffm. & Muschl. - tropical Africa
 Microglossa densiflora Hook.f. - central Africa
 Microglossa longiradiata Wild - South Africa
 Microglossa mespilifolia (Less.) B.L.Rob. - South Africa
 Microglossa oehleri Muschl.
 Microglossa pyrifolia (Lam.) Kuntze - Africa, Madagascar, China, India, Southeast Asia
 Microglossa zeylanica (Arn.) Benth. & Hook.f. - Sri Lanka
 formerly included
several species once included in Microglossa, now considered better suited to other genera: Aster Conyza Psiadia

References

Asteraceae genera
Astereae